William Dion Venable (born October 29, 1982) is an American professional baseball coach and former player. He is the associate manager of the Texas Rangers of Major League Baseball (MLB). He played in MLB as an outfielder for the San Diego Padres, Texas Rangers and Los Angeles Dodgers, and he was a coach for the Chicago Cubs. He is the son of former MLB outfielder Max Venable and is the older brother of former Canadian Football League player Winston Venable.

Venable played college basketball for Princeton, where he was the second athlete to earn first-team All-Ivy League honors in both baseball and basketball. In the 2005 MLB Draft, the Padres selected Venable in the seventh round; he made his major league debut in 2008. Although he broke into MLB as a center fielder, he played mostly as a right fielder after his second season. He finished among the top 10 in the National League in triples four times and in stolen bases twice. He has the most MLB career hits and home runs of any Princeton alumnus.

Early life and amateur career 
Venable was born in 1982 in Greenbrae in Marin County, California, at a time when his father Max Venable was a Major League Baseball player for the nearby San Francisco Giants. He grew up travelling around the country with his father and also lived in Japan and the Dominican Republic.

High school
In high school, he envisioned himself as more likely to be a professional basketball player than baseball player. Prior to his freshman year, his mother, Molly, objected to him quitting baseball to focus on basketball. As both a high school sophomore and a high school junior, Venable was second-team San Francisco Bay Area All-Metro basketball player for San Rafael High School. He was the Marin County Athletic League (MCAL) most valuable player in basketball as a freshman, sophomore and junior. As a sophomore, he led his team to the MCAL League Championship. As a senior, he gave up the responsibility of being point forward.

College career
Venable chose to attend Princeton University, not for its academics, but for its tradition of basketball excellence. He respected their tradition of qualifying to participate in the NCAA Men's Division I Basketball Championship Tournament. During his time at the University he was a part of two teams that qualified for post season play: 2004 NCAA Men's Division I Basketball Tournament and 2002 National Invitation Tournament). Princeton recruited him as a basketball player. He did not play baseball as a freshman, but his father had directed him to Scott Bradley, Princeton's baseball coach, during his recruiting visit.

Venable, who was a member of the class of 2005 at Princeton University, was the second athlete in Ivy League history (after his Padres teammate Chris Young) to be first-team All-Ivy in both basketball and baseball and he played on Ivy League Champion National Collegiate Athletic Association (NCAA) Championship tournament participants in both sports. He played in two NCAA Championship tournaments in both sports and earned a B.A. in anthropology.

In basketball, he averaged over 10 points and over 30 minutes per game in his 2002–03 sophomore season through his 2004–05 senior season.

Bradley had left the door open for Venable to come take batting practice if he ever had the urge. As a sophomore, at the suggestion of his mother, Venable resumed baseball. He posted modest numbers in his first season, but in 2004, he hit for a .344 batting average, earned All-Ivy honorable mention, and was drafted by the Baltimore Orioles in the 15th round of the draft (439th overall). Bradley felt that Major League Baseball scouts undervalued Venable because he did not participate in the Cape Cod League for college baseball players. Thus, instead of signing and giving up his amateur status, Venable returned for his senior season and posted a league leading 9 home runs and runner-up .385 batting average while earning All-League honors. Subsequently, the Padres drafted him in the seventh round (215th overall); he was signed by the Padres' Northeast Scouting Director, Jim Bretz.

Professional career

Minor League Baseball
After graduating from Princeton, Venable made his professional debut in minor league baseball with the Arizona League Padres of the Arizona League in 2005. He hit for a .322 batting average in 15 games and was soon promoted to the Eugene Emeralds of the Single-A Northwest League.

In 2006, Venable was the Padres Minor League Player of the Year. With his father as a team hitting coach, Venable posted a .314 batting average, .389 on-base percentage (OBP), and .477 slugging percentage for the Fort Wayne Wizards of the single-A Midwest League (MWL), which earned him both mid-season and post-season MWL All-star honors. That season he tied for the MWL lead in runs scored and was among the top four Padre farmhands in RBIs, batting average, and stolen bases. Among his highlights for the Wizards were his team-high two grand slams and a five-hit performance.

Subsequently, for the 2006 West Oahu CaneFires of the Hawaii Winter Baseball, Venable posted a .330 batting average, .390 on-base percentage (OBP), and .473 slugging percentage. He won the batting title that season and was named league most valuable player. He also led the league in doubles and was second to John Otness in OBP. In the outfield, Venable made no errors. Before the 2007 season, Venable was listed as the fifth best prospect in the Padres organization by Baseball America, and they named him the #11 prospect in the league. They also named him as a Baseball America Low-A All-Star.

In 2007, Venable batted .278 with a .337 OBP in 134 games for the San Antonio Missions of the Texas League. This again earned him both mid-season and post-season league All-Star honors. A highlight occurred on May 30, 2007, when he hit for the cycle. After the season ended, he was invited to play for the San Diego affiliate in the Arizona Fall League, but he was afflicted with tendinitis in his shoulder and only hit .228.

During 2008 spring training, he had two home runs and eight runs batted in his first twelve at-bats. He then posted a .292 batting average, .361 on-base percentage and .464 slugging percentage in 120 games for the Portland Beavers of the Pacific Coast League in 2008.

San Diego Padres

2008–2011
Venable had been expected to be a September 2008 call-up, but when Scott Hairston was forced onto the disabled list, Venable was called up ahead of schedule. On August 29, 2008, in his debut, he tripled in his first at-bat and came around to score a run. He is the twenty-fifth Princeton alumnus to play in the Major Leagues, but he is the first African-American alumnus. He posted his first Major League home run in his sixth game on September 4, 2008, during a 5–2 victory over the Milwaukee Brewers at Miller Park. His only other home run for the 2008 San Diego Padres was also in a victory on the road on September 19, 2008 in an 11–6 victory over the Washington Nationals at Nationals Park. During this game, Venable posted his first three-hit performance and first three-RBI performance. When Venable batted leadoff for the Padres on September 28, 2008 against Pittsburgh, he became the first Princeton batter to oppose a Princeton pitcher (Ross Ohlendorf). In 2008, Venable accumulated only 110 Major League at-bats, and rookie year is considered to be the season in which one accumulates his 130th at-bat. He only played centerfield in 2008. Following the season he played winter baseball in the Dominican Professional Baseball League, where he struggled.

Although in 2008 Baseball America projected Venable as an every day starter for the Padres in 2010, some experts questioned whether he would be a long-term solution in center field for the team. Venable started the 2009 season with the Padres' Triple-A affiliate, Portland Beavers, but he was recalled by the Padres on June 3. His father, Max, served as the Beavers' hitting coach in 2009. Following the July 5 trade of Scott Hairston to the Oakland Athletics, Venable shared right field with Kyle Blanks. On July 12 against the San Francisco Giants, he had his first home run of the season in his first career four-hit game. Between July 30 and August 5, he homered in five of seven games. In an August 23 game against the St. Louis Cardinals, he was involved in a bench-clearing incident when Albert Pujols thought he threw an elbow while being tagged out. In 2009, he posted 12 home runs and tallied 38 runs batted in (RBI), while defensively 493.2 of his 643 innings were spent in right field and only 117 in center field.

In 2010, he finished 8th in the National League in triples (7), and 9th stolen bases (29). He executed some delayed steals by taking off with the toss back to the mound "when neither infielder is covering second and the catcher is nonchalant with the ball after receiving the pitch". On May 19, Venable moved into the lead off position in the lineup and he fell a home run shy of the franchise's first cycle against the Los Angeles Dodgers, going 4-for-5 at the plate after getting a triple in the 1st inning and a double in the third. On June 23, 25 and 27, Venable hit tie-breaking home runs in Padre victories against the Florida Marlins and Tampa Bay Rays. On July 3, he went on the 15-day disabled list due to back problems. On September 29 against the Chicago Cubs, he stole two potential home runs (from Alfonso Soriano and Aramis Ramírez) on deep fly balls. In the game, he achieved his career-high 10-game hitting streak. He also led National League outfielders with 5 errors. He set new career-highs with 13 home runs and 51 RBI. Again, the majority of his innings were in right field (600.1 of 936.1 innings). He split his remaining time between left field (171.2) and center field (164.1).

In 2011, Venable started slowly, hitting only .205 in April and was eventually optioned to the Tucson Padres on May 23 before being recalled on June 9. At the time of his demotion, he had no home runs and a .224 batting average in 134 at-bats. He was recalled after going 16-for-58 with 3 doubles, 3 triples, 3 home runs and 3 stolen bases in 14 games. In one minor league game on May 27 he homered twice against the Salt Lake Bees. On July 20, Venable scored 3 times in the first two innings as the Padres jumped out to a 13–0 lead against the Florida Marlins. In late July, he missed a few games due to back spasms. On August 10 against the New York Mets, Venable had four hits again missing the cycle by a home run when he posted a second double in a ninth inning at bat. On August 21, Veneble delivered a lead off home run and the game-winning bases-loaded walk-off hit on Trevor Hoffman Day. On September 28, he got his first grand slam home run against the Chicago Cubs off of Ryan Dempster. For the season, his totals dropped to 9 home runs and 44 RBI with the Padres, and he again totaled 7 triples, this time finishing 10th. He played 662.2 of his 793.2 innings in right field.

2012–2015
In 2012, Venable and Chris Denorfia formed a platoon in right field, with Venable getting most of the starts against right-handed pitchers and batting .270 against them.  Venable made 80 starts in right, but appeared in a then-career-high 148 games for the year.  When not starting in right, he made occasional starts in center and left field and made 26 pinch-hitting appearances.  On May 15, 2012, Venable had a single, double and triple by the fourth inning against the Washington Nationals, but his 4-hit effort again fell short of the franchise's cycle. On May 23, Venable had his sixth career lead off home run and added a single in the second inning and a double in the fourth against the St. Louis Cardinals. He ended up one hit shy of the cycle for the fifth time, this time a triple. On June 3, Venable suffered a strained oblique muscle and left the game, missing four more games with the injury.  Venable finished the year batting .264 with 9 home runs and 45 RBI.  He collected 8 triples, finishing 9th in the league, and also committed 7 errors, tied for first among NL outfielders.

Coming into 2013, Venable was again expected to platoon with Denorfia in right, but injuries to center fielder Cameron Maybin and left fielder Carlos Quentin expanded his playing time.  He made 68 starts in right and 52 in center and played in a career-high 151 games.  Venable entered the season with 401 hits, which was 48 shy of the record for an alumnus of Princeton Tigers Baseball held by Moe Berg. His 46 home runs were already a school best. For the week of August 12–18, 2013, Venable won the National League Player of the Week Award. During the week Venable tied his single-game career high with 4 hits, joined the Padres' 100-steal club, hit a walk-off home run, made a home run stealing catch and surpassed his previous career best hitting streak by 5 to 15. It marked his first Player of the Week Award as he hit .406 (13-for-32) with two home runs, two doubles, a triple and seven runs scored. On September 13, David Hale (Princeton class of 2011) made his major league debut for the Atlanta Braves, and it became the second Princeton vs. Princeton batter-pitcher matchup in major league history. Hale struck out Venable and eight other Padres in his debut for the Braves, setting a franchise debut record.  Venable was voted the Padres' Most Valuable Player for the 2013 season by local baseball writers and other members of the media as he became the 8th player in Padres history to record at least 20 home runs and 20 steals in a season.  For the year, Venable hit .268 with 22 home runs and a .796 on-base plus slugging, all new career highs. He also stole 22 bases and finished tied for 5th in the league with 8 triples.

On September 2, 2013, Venable signed a two-year contract extension with the Padres to keep him in San Diego through the 2015 season. Venable batted .224 with eight home runs in the 2014 season. His batting average, .288 on-base percentage, .325 slugging percentage, and 38 RBIs were all career lows for a full season. During the 2014–15 offseason, the Padres acquired outfielders Matt Kemp, Justin Upton, and Wil Myers, shifting Venable into a reserve role. For the Padres in 2015, Venable hit .258 with six home runs, 10 doubles, and 11 stolen bases through mid-August.

Texas Rangers
On August 18, 2015, the Padres traded Venable to the Texas Rangers for catcher Marcus Greene and a player to be named later (PTBNL). The Rangers needed another outfielder to supplement players like Josh Hamilton, who have dealt with injuries in the past. The PTBNL was announced as Jon Edwards on August 21, after Edwards cleared waivers and could be traded.

Philadelphia Philles
On February 28, 2016, Venable signed a minor league deal with the Cleveland Indians. On March 27, he was released by the Indians. The next day, Venable signed a minor league contract with the Philadelphia Phillies. On June 11, 2016, Venable opted out of his minor league deal with the Phillies and became a free agent.

Los Angeles Dodgers
On June 14, 2016, the Los Angeles Dodgers signed Venable and added him to their major league roster. He appeared in six games for the Dodgers and had one hit (a double) in 10 at-bats before he was designated for assignment on June 24. He cleared waivers and accepted an outright assignment to AAA Oklahoma City. On July 1, the Dodgers brought him back to the active roster when Joc Pederson went on the disabled list. The following week he was again designated for assignment and he again accepted an outright assignment to Oklahoma City. He had one hit in 19 at-bats for Los Angeles and played in 46 games for Oklahoma City, where he hit .276.

Post-playing career
On September 6, 2017, Venable was named a special assistant to Chicago Cubs president Theo Epstein. Venable served as the first base coach of the Cubs in 2018 and 2019. For the 2020 season, he was shifted to third base coach.

On November 20, 2020, Venable was announced as the bench coach of the Boston Red Sox. On May 29, 2021, Venable managed his first MLB game, filling in for Alex Cora in a game against the Miami Marlins, as Cora was in Puerto Rico to attend the high school graduation of one of his children; the Red Sox won, 3–1. On August 7, 2021, during a series in Canada against the Toronto Blue Jays, Venable tested positive for COVID-19, resulting in Venable and first-base coach Tom Goodwin (deemed a close contact) quarantining away from the rest of Red Sox personnel.

During the 2022 season, Venable led the Red Sox for six games in the latter half of April after manager Cora tested positive for COVID-19; the team went 1–5 in those games.

On November 16, 2022, Venable was hired by the Texas Rangers to be an associate manager alongside Bruce Bochy.

See also
List of second-generation Major League Baseball players

References

External links

1982 births
Living people
20th-century African-American people
21st-century African-American sportspeople
African-American baseball coaches
African-American baseball players
American men's basketball players
Arizona League Padres players
Baseball coaches from California
Baseball players from California
Basketball players from California
Boston Red Sox coaches
Chicago Cubs coaches
Eugene Emeralds players
Fort Wayne Wizards players
Gigantes del Cibao players
American expatriate baseball players in the Dominican Republic
Lake Elsinore Storm players
Lehigh Valley IronPigs players
Los Angeles Dodgers players
Major League Baseball bench coaches
Major League Baseball center fielders
Major League Baseball first base coaches
Major League Baseball third base coaches
Oklahoma City Dodgers players
People from Greenbrae, California
Peoria Saguaros players
Portland Beavers players
Princeton Tigers baseball players
Princeton Tigers men's basketball players
San Antonio Missions players
San Diego Padres players
Texas Rangers coaches
Texas Rangers players
West Oahu Canefires players